Benjamin Lewis Jones (born 11 April 1931) is a Welsh former rugby union and rugby league footballer who played in the 1950s and 1960s. A dual-code rugby international he won nine caps for Wales at full-back, centre, wing, before turning professional and playing rugby league for Leeds (Heritage No. 896), Great Britain, Other Nationalities and Wales. Rugby league historian Robert Gate has described Lewis Jones as "arguably the most devastating attacking back Wales has ever produced." His acceleration over the first few yards allowed him to penetrate almost any defence in the mid-1950s.

Background
Born Saturday, 11 April 1931, in Gorseinon, Swansea, Lewis Jones was educated at Gowerton Grammar School, and played club rugby for Neath before undertaking his national service in the Navy. After leaving the Navy he joined Llanelli. He won his first cap for Wales against England in 1950. This was a match Jones might easily have missed, as he had been about to depart for Hong Kong on board an aircraft carrier until the orders were countermanded on discovering that he was a rugby player. The same year he played for the British Lions, being flown out as a replacement for an injured player on the tour to New Zealand and Australia, and playing in three test matches. He scored 63 points in seven games in New Zealand and 16 points against Australia in Brisbane.

Professional playing career
In November 1952 Jones signed for Leeds rugby league club for a record £6,000 (based on increases in average earnings, this would be approximately £419,300 in 2016). A broken arm prevented him having much impact in his first season but in the 1953–54 season he scored 302 points and he first represented Wales in 1953 against France. Jones toured Australasia in 1954. In 1956–57 he scored a record 496 points. He also set the record for most points in a test series in 1956–57. He played in the 1957 World Cup.

In the 1960–61 season he played a great part in Leeds' first Championship.

Lewis Jones played , was the captain, and scored a try, and 5 conversions in Leeds' 25–10 victory over Warrington in the Championship Final during the 1960–61 season at Odsal Stadium, Bradford on Saturday 20 May 1961, in front of a crowd of 52,177.

Lewis Jones played , and scored 3-conversions in Leeds' 9–19 defeat by Wakefield Trinity in the 1961 Yorkshire County Cup Final during the 1961–62 season at Odsal Stadium, Bradford on Saturday 11 November 1961.

After the 1953 game against France, Wales did not play another officially recognised international match until 1968; but during this period a representative Wales team played in two games against France. The second of these games saw Jones given the captaincy, leading the Wales team out at Toulouse on 17 February 1963. Despite playing twice for Wales, he was only capped for the first match.

Lewis also represented Great Britain while at Leeds between 1952 and 1956 against France (2 non-Test matches). Lewis Jones represented the Rest of the World in the 11–20 defeat by Australia at Sydney Cricket Ground on 29 June 1957.

Jones' Testimonial match at Leeds took place in 1963. He was the first Leeds player to score over 1,000 goals for the club, a feat not matched until 2009 Kevin Sinfield. Jones became one of fewer than ten Welshmen to have scored more than 2,000 points in their rugby league career.

Jones won 15 caps for Great Britain at rugby league, scoring in every game he played. He spent six years as a player-coach and a further two years as coach of the Wentworthville Magpies in Australia. During his eight-year tenure Wentworthville won seven Second Division premierships. A schoolteacher by profession, he later taught mathematics in Leeds.

As of 2015, he is 9th in British rugby league's "most points in a career" record list behind; Neil Fox, Jim Sullivan, Kevin Sinfield, Gus Risman, John Woods, Mick Nanyn, Cyril Kellett and Kel Coslett.

Post playing
Arriva Yorkshire honoured thirteen rugby league footballers on Thursday 20 August 2009, at a ceremony at Wheldon Road, the home of Castleford. A fleet of new buses were named after the 'Arriva Yorkshire Rugby League Dream Team', which included Jones. Members of the public nominated the best ever rugby league footballers to have played in West Yorkshire, supported by local rugby league journalists; James Deighton from BBC Leeds, and Tim Butcher, editor of Rugby League World.

In 2013 Jones, along with three other former players, was inducted into the Rugby League Hall of Fame.

References

Further reading

External links
!Great Britain Statistics at englandrl.co.uk (statistics currently missing due to not having appeared for both Great Britain, and England)
(archived by web.archive.org) Lewis Jones at wales.rleague.com
(archived by web.archive.org) Profile at leedsrugby.dnsupdate.co.uk
U.K. League Hooker in Doubt
Welsh convert XIII

1931 births
Living people
British & Irish Lions rugby union players from Wales
Dewsbury Rams coaches
Dual-code rugby internationals
Great Britain national rugby league team players
Leeds Rhinos captains
Leeds Rhinos players
Llanelli RFC players
Neath RFC players
People educated at Gowerton Grammar School
Other Nationalities rugby league team players
Rugby league centres
Rugby league five-eighths
Rugby league fullbacks
Rugby league halfbacks
Rugby league players from Swansea
Rugby league wingers
Rugby union fullbacks
Rugby union players from Gorseinon
Wales international rugby union players
Wales national rugby league team players
Welsh rugby league coaches
Welsh rugby league players
Welsh rugby union players
Wentworthville Magpies players